Sathya Jyothi Films is an Indian film production and distribution company in Tamil Nadu. It was established in 1977 by T. G. Thyagarajan.

History 
Sathya Jyothi Films was founded by T. G. Thyagarajan in the 1970s. Thyagarajan, an MBA graduate from the United States, is the son of film producer, late Venus T. Govindarajan, who had made films from the 1960s to the 1980s under Venus Pictures. Thyagarajan initially ventured into film productions under the studio Sathya Movies, production company of his father-in-law R. M. Veerappan before founding Sathya Jyothi Films to make "slightly offbeat films". The first film distributed by the company was the Tamil-dubbed version of Yashoda Krishna. The company's first film as producers was Moondram Pirai (1982).

Productions

Films 

 All films are in Tamil, unless otherwise noted.

Television 
Jeipathu Nijam  (1999)
Gopuram (2002)
Varam (2003)
Anandham (2003–2009)
Kalyanam (2009)
Idhayam (2009–2012)
Aan Paavam (2012)
Puguntha Veedu (2012–2014)
Maya (2012–2013)
Annakodiyum Aindhu Pengalum (2015)
Sumangali (2017–2019)
Thirumagal (2020–present)

References

Bibliography

External links 
 Official site

1977 establishments in Tamil Nadu
Film production companies based in Chennai
Indian companies established in 1977
Mass media companies established in 1977
Television production companies of Tamil Nadu